Crossroads, West Virginia may refer to:

Crossroads, Monongalia County, West Virginia
Crossroads, Summers County, West Virginia

See also
Orleans Cross Roads, West Virginia
Stotlers Crossroads, West Virginia
Spohrs Crossroads, West Virginia
Smith Crossroads, West Virginia
Johnson Crossroads, West Virginia